Down River is a Canadian drama film, directed by Benjamin Ratner and released in 2013.

Created as a tribute to actress Babz Chula following her death in 2010, the film stars Helen Shaver as Pearl, an older woman who is a friend and mentor to actress Fawn (Gabrielle Miller), visual artist Aki (Jennifer Spence) and bisexual musician Harper (Colleen Rennison). The cast also includes Jay Brazeau, Tahmoh Penikett, Ali Liebert, Brian Markinson, Tom McBeath and Hiro Kanagawa.

The film premiered at the 2013 Cinéfest Sudbury International Film Festival. It was subsequently screened at the Vancouver International Film Festival, where it won the Audience Award for Most Popular Canadian Film and received an honorable mention from the jury for the Best British Columbia Film award.

Awards
The film won the Vancouver Film Critics Circle's award for Best British Columbia Film, and Rennison received a Canadian Screen Award nomination for Best Original Song at the 2nd Canadian Screen Awards, for the song "Molly".

The film led the nominations at the 2014 Leo Awards with 13 nods, including Best Motion Picture, Best Actress (Shaver), Best Supporting Actress (2: Rennison, Spence), Best Director (Ratner), Best Screenplay (Ratner), Best Musical Score (Chris Ainscough, Kevin House), Best Editing (Robert Wenzek), Best Cinematography (Larry Lynn),  Best Production Design (Josh Plaw), Best Costume Design (Gloria Tsui) and Best Overall Sound (Brian Lyster, Randy Kiss and Michael Macdonald). It won the awards for Best Picture, Supporting Actress (Spence), Screenplay, Costume Design and Overall Sound.

References

External links
 

2013 LGBT-related films
2013 films
Canadian drama films
Canadian LGBT-related films
English-language Canadian films
Films set in British Columbia
Films shot in British Columbia
LGBT-related drama films
2013 drama films
2010s English-language films
2010s Canadian films